The 2012–13 season was Sport Lisboa e Benfica's 109th season in existence and the club's 79th consecutive season in the top flight of Portuguese football. It involved Benfica competing in the Primeira Liga, Taça de Portugal, Taça da Liga and the group stage of the UEFA Champions League. Benfica qualified for the Champions League by coming second in the previous Primeira Liga.

Benfica could have enjoyed a treble in May if they could win the UEFA Europa League, maintain their lead in the Primeira Liga, and win the Taça de Portugal. In the league, they came second to Porto after conceding a 90th-minute goal; and despite a win in their last match, they could not prevent their rivals from winning the title. Afterwards, they lost the UEFA Europa League Final to then European champions Chelsea (2–1) when Branislav Ivanović headed in an injury-time winner. In the Taça de Portugal, Benfica reached the final for the first time since 2004–05 Taça de Portugal but lost to Vitória de Guimarães, conceding two goals in two minutes. The Taça da Liga ended at the semi-finals, which prevented Benfica for winning their fifth league cup in a row.

In the UEFA Champions League, Benfica finished third in the group stage, with ten points, behind Barcelona and Celtic, and was relegated to the UEFA Europa League, where they reached the club's ninth European final and first since 1990.

Review and events
In manager Jorge Jesus' fourth year with the club, starting midfielders Javi García and Axel Witsel were sold to Manchester City for €23 million and Zenit Saint Petersburg for €40 million, respectively; Nemanja Matić and Enzo Pérez replaced the duo in the regular starting lineup. Striker Javier Saviola's contract was mutually terminated, where he then joined Málaga of the Spanish La Liga on a free transfer. Starting left-back Emerson was also sold, joining Turkish club Trabzonspor for a transfer fee of €1.6 million. Other notable outgoing transfers included left-back and former Spanish international Joan Capdevila to Espanyol for €500,000, the loaning of longtime Benfica midfielder Rúben Amorim to Braga and the loaning of Portuguese international striker Nélson Oliveira to Deportivo de La Coruña. In the winter transfer window, winger Nolito was loaned to Granada.

On the right wing, Eduardo Salvio, on loan with Benfica for the 2010–11 season from Atlético Madrid, returned to regain his place after the club paid Atlético €13.5 million for his services. Ola John, part of the Dutch Twente squad that faced Benfica the year before in UEFA Champions League qualifying, was also purchased for a fee of €9 million, providing Jesus with another option on the left wing behind Nicolás Gaitán, now back on the left wing. Benfica then added striker Lima from Braga, who quickly established himself as a starting striker alongside Óscar Cardozo, relegating Rodrigo to the bench.

For the upcoming season, Benfica also signed depth players Paulo Lopes from Feirense, Luisinho from Paços de Ferreira, Michel from Braga and Hugo Vieira from Gil Vicente, who was immediately loaned out to Sporting de Gijón. Returning from loan were Lorenzo Melgarejo from Paços de Ferreira, Carlos Martins from Granada, Enzo Pérez from Estudiantes de La Plata and Alan Kardec from Santos.

Competitions

Pre-season

Primeira Liga

League table

Results summary

Results by round

Matches

Taça de Portugal

Taça da Liga

Group stage

Knockout phase

UEFA Champions League

Group stage

UEFA Europa League

Knockout phase

Round of 32

Round of 16

Quarter-finals

Semi-finals

Final

Overall record

Players

Statistics

|-
! colspan="15" style="background:#dcdcdc; text-align:center;"| Goalkeepers

|-
! colspan="15" style="background:#dcdcdc; text-align:center;"| Defenders

|-
! colspan="15" style="background:#dcdcdc; text-align:center;"| Midfielders

|-
! colspan="15" style="background:#dcdcdc; text-align:center;"| Strikers

|-
! colspan="15" style="background:#dcdcdc; text-align:center;"| No longer at club

|}

1.Players who were in the squad at the time of the first competitive fixture.
2.Also includes 2012–13 UEFA Champions League and 2012–13 UEFA Europa League.

Transfers

In

Out

References

S.L. Benfica seasons
Benfica
Benfica
Benfica